Glutathione peroxidase (GPx) is the general name of an enzyme family with peroxidase activity whose main biological role is to protect the organism from oxidative damage. The biochemical function of glutathione peroxidase is to reduce lipid hydroperoxides to their corresponding alcohols and to reduce free hydrogen peroxide to water.

Isozymes 
Several isozymes are encoded by different genes, which vary in cellular location and substrate specificity. Glutathione peroxidase 1  (GPx1) is the most abundant version, found in the cytoplasm of nearly all mammalian tissues, whose preferred substrate is hydrogen peroxide. Glutathione peroxidase 4 (GPx4) has a high preference for lipid hydroperoxides; it is expressed in nearly every mammalian cell, though at much lower levels. Glutathione peroxidase 2  is an intestinal and extracellular enzyme, while glutathione peroxidase 3 is extracellular, especially abundant in plasma. So far, eight different isoforms of glutathione peroxidase (GPx1-8) have been identified in humans.

Reaction 
The main reaction that glutathione peroxidase catalyzes is:
 2GSH + H2O2 → GS–SG + 2H2O
where GSH represents reduced monomeric glutathione, and GS–SG represents glutathione disulfide.  The mechanism involves oxidation of the selenol of a selenocysteine residue by hydrogen peroxide.  This process gives the derivative with a selenenic acid (RSeOH) group. The selenenic acid is then converted back to the selenol by a two step process that begins with reaction with GSH to form the GS-SeR and water.  A second GSH molecule reduces the GS-SeR intermediate back to the selenol, releasing GS-SG as the by-product.  A simplified representation is shown below:
 RSeH  +  H2O2   →  RSeOH  +  H2O
 RSeOH  +  GSH   →  GS-SeR  +  H2O
 GS-SeR  +  GSH   →  GS-SG  +  RSeH

Glutathione reductase then reduces the oxidized glutathione to complete the cycle:
 GS–SG  +  NADPH  +  H+ →   2 GSH  +  NADP+.

Structure 
Mammalian GPx1, GPx2, GPx3, and GPx4 have been shown to be selenium-containing enzymes, whereas GPx6 is a selenoprotein in humans with cysteine-containing homologues in rodents. GPx1, GPx2, and GPx3 are homotetrameric proteins, whereas GPx4 has a monomeric structure. As the integrity of the cellular and subcellular membranes depends heavily on glutathione peroxidase, its antioxidative protective system itself depends heavily on the presence of selenium.

Animal models 

Mice genetically engineered to lack glutathione peroxidase 1 (Gpx1−/− mice) are grossly phenotypically normal and have normal lifespans, indicating this enzyme is not critical for life. However, Gpx1−/− mice develop cataracts at an early age and exhibit defects in muscle satellite cell proliferation. Gpx1 −/− mice showed up to 16 dB higher auditory brainstem response (ABR) thresholds than control mice.  After 110 dB noise exposure for one hour, Gpx1 −/− mice had up to 15 dB greater noise-induced hearing loss compared with  control mice."

Mice with knockouts for GPX3 (GPX3−/−) or GPX2 (GPX2−/−) also develop normally 

However, glutathione peroxidase 4 knockout mice die during early embryonic development. Some evidence, though, indicates reduced levels of glutathione peroxidase 4 can increase life expectancy in mice.

The bovine erythrocyte enzyme has a molecular weight of 84 kDa.

Discovery 

Glutathione peroxidase was discovered in 1957 by Gordon C. Mills.

Methods for determining glutathione peroxidase activity 
Activity of glutathione peroxidase is measured spectrophotometrically using several methods. A direct assay by linking the peroxidase reaction with glutathione reductase with measurement of the conversion of NADPH to NADP is widely used.  The other approach is measuring residual GSH in the reaction with Ellman's reagent. Based on this, several procedures for measuring glutathione peroxidase activity were developed using various hydroperoxides as substrates for reduction, e.g. cumene hydroperoxide, tert-butyl hydroperoxide  and hydrogen peroxide.

The other methods include the use of CUPRAC reagent with spectrophotometric detection of the reaction product or o-phtalaldehyde as a fluorescent reagent.

Clinical significance 

It has been shown that low levels of glutathione peroxidase as measured in the serum may be a contributing factor to vitiligo. Lower plasma glutathione peroxide levels were also observed in patients with type 2 diabetes with macroalbuminuria and this was correlated to the stage of diabetic nephropathy.  In one study, the activity of glutathione peroxidase along with other antioxidant enzymes such as superoxide dismutase and catalase was not associated with coronary heart disease risk in women. Glutathione peroxidase activity was found to be much lower in patients with relapsing-remitting multiple sclerosis. One study has suggested that glutathione peroxidase and superoxide dismutase polymorphisms play a role in the development of celiac disease.

The activity of this enzyme has been reported to be decreased in case of copper deficiency in the liver and plasma.

See also 
 Catalase
 Superoxide dismutase
 Glutathione reductase
 Selenium deficiency

References 

EC 1.11.1
Antioxidants
Copper enzymes
Selenoproteins